Obrosov (masculine) or Obrosovo (feminine) is a Russian last name, a variant of Abrosimov. The following people bear this last name:
Dr. Obrosov (d. 1937), one of the Kremlin doctors signing a false report regarding death of Nadezhda Alliluyeva, second wife of Joseph Stalin

See also
Obrosovo, several rural localities in Russia

References

Notes

Sources
И. М. Ганжина (I. M. Ganzhina). "Словарь современных русских фамилий" (Dictionary of Modern Russian Last Names). Москва, 2001. 

Russian-language surnames
